Omoba Adegboyega Folaranmi Adedoyin, M.D. (11 September 1922 – January 2014) was a Nigerian-born British high jumper and long jumper, who became the first Nigerian to compete in an Olympics final in 1948.

Personal life 
He was born in Shagamu, Ogun, the second son of the local king. He came to the United Kingdom in 1942 to study at Queen's University of Belfast where he graduated in medicine in 1949.

Athletics career 
He won the 1947 AAA Championships in Loughborough in the high jump with a clearance of 1.93 metres. Adedoyin featured in a 1947 newsreel by Pathé News focusing on university sports. In the footage, he is described as 'a good bet to represent Britain at the Olympic Games'.

He went on to compete in the 1948 Summer Olympics, both in the high jump and the long jump. In the high jump, on 30 July, he qualified for the final, as one of 20 competitors who made it past the qualifying round, where a height of 1.87 metres was needed to qualify. The sheer number of competitors in the high jump meant that the event seemed endless. In the final he jumped 1.90 metres on his third attempt to come twelfth – if he had cleared it on his first attempt he could have finished as high as sixth. A day later in the long jump, he qualified by virtue of placing in the top twelve in the qualifying round as less than twelve athletes reached the qualifying distance of 7.20 metres, with only five reaching it in the final. Adedoyin was one of these, placing fifth with a jump of 7.27 metres.

His personal best jumps were 1.969 metres in the high jump (1949) and 7.35 metres in the long jump (1947).

Life after athletics 
After the Olympics, he went back to Nigeria to practise as an obstetrician-gynaecologist.

He died in January 2014.

References

1922 births
2014 deaths
Nigerian male long jumpers
Nigerian male high jumpers
English male long jumpers
English male high jumpers
Olympic athletes of Great Britain
Athletes (track and field) at the 1948 Summer Olympics
People from Sagamu
English people of Yoruba descent
Nigerian emigrants to the United Kingdom
Yoruba royalty
Yoruba sportspeople
Alumni of Queen's University Belfast
Royal Olympic participants